The 2023 Old Dominion Monarchs football team will represent Old Dominion University for the 2023 NCAA Division I FBS football season. The Monarchs will play their home games at S.B. Ballard Stadium in Norfolk, Virginia. It will be their second football season in the Sun Belt Conference, competing in the East Division. The team will be coached by fourth-year head coach Ricky Rahne.

Previous season

The Monarchs finished the 2022 season 3–9, 2–6 in Sun Belt play to finish in last place in the East Division.

Schedule
The football schedule was announced February 24, 2023.

References

Old Dominion
Old Dominion Monarchs football seasons
Old Dominion Monarchs football